Salim Georges Sfeir (born 18 September 1944) is a Lebanese – Swiss banker and financier. He is the chairman and Chief Executive of Bank of Beirut S.A.L in Beirut, Lebanon since 1993 and the chairman of Association of Banks in Lebanon since June 29, 2019.

Early life and education
Salim Sfeir was born on September 18, 1944, and raised in Beirut. He received his B.S.S. degree in economics from the Université de Montréal and his Masters of Business Administration from the University of Detroit Mercy. As an educator, Sfeir lectured at Lebanese University, Beirut University College, Haigazian College, l’Université Saint-Joseph and Le Centre d’études bancaires.

In the years to follow, he was appointed trustee on the board of directors of the Lebanese American University (LAU), Beirut and Byblos; vice-chairman of the board of trustees of the University of the Holy Spirit (USEK); member of the board of trustees AMIDEAST; and vice-chairman of the American Friends of the Middle East, Beirut.

Sfeir has been associated with the newly commissioned Salim Sfeir Building at the School of Business Administration at USEK, the Holy Spirit University of Kaslik, being awarded honorary degrees at both USEK and the American University of Science and Technology (AUST).

Career 
Sfeir began his career in finance with the Bank of Nova Scotia. (Years later he would acquire the Bank of Nova Scotia branch in London.) By 1980, he joined Bankmed in Beirut as Deputy General Manager. Three years later, he formed Wedge Bank (Middle East) as General Manager, and in 1987 launched Wedge Bank Switzerland as Chief Executive and vice chairman.

The turning point came with the management buy-in of Bank of Beirut in 1993. This local bank eventually expanded to nine countries on four continents. Today, Bank of Beirut comprises more than 100 branches and strategic business units internationally.

In close association with His Beatitude Bechara Boutros Al Rahi, the patriarch of the Maronite Church, Sfeir formed the World Maronite Foundation for Integral Development, whose mission is to harness the full potential of the Church and its adherents, to ensure funding from Lebanese nationals and the diaspora.

In 2019, Sfeir was unanimously elected as chairman of the influential Association of Banks in Lebanon (ABL).
He was reelected the 29 June 2021.

Honours and awards 
Sfeir has been recognized through many honors internationally, including:

Inauguration of the Library of the Pontifical Maronite College in Rome
Medal of Saint Maroun by Mar Bechara Boutros El Rai, Patriarch of Antioch
Honorary Doctorate in Humane Letters Honoris Causa, Lebanese American University
Knight Commander of the Pontifical Order of Pope Saint Sylvester
Medal of the National Order of the Cedar conferred by President Michel Suleiman
Medal of the Maronite Patriarchate, Maronite Patriarch of Antioch

See also 

 Marwan Kheireddine
 Antoun Sehnaoui

References

External links 
Bank of Beirut shrugs-off economic challenges
People:Bank of Beirut SAL (BOB.BY)

1944 births
Living people
People from Beirut
Lebanese bankers
Economy of Lebanon
Université de Montréal alumni
University of Detroit Mercy alumni
Academic staff of Lebanese University
Academic staff of Haigazian University
Academic staff of Saint Joseph University